Georges Loriot was an actor known for his role as Professeur Tournesol in the live action Tintin movie Tintin et le mystère de la Toison d'Or (French)

Filmography

References 

French male film actors
20th-century French male actors
Year of birth missing
Place of birth missing